Chièvres is a city and municipality of Wallonia located in the province of Hainaut, Belgium.

On January 1, 2018, Chièvres had a total population of 6,899. The total area is 46.91 km² which gives a population density of 150 inhabitants per km². Chièvres Air Base is located in the municipality.

The municipality consists of the following districts: Chièvres, Grosage, Huissignies, Ladeuze, Tongre-Saint-Martin, and Tongre-Notre-Dame.

In 1918 the town was delivered by the 5th Battalion of the Gordon Highlanders from four years of military occupation during the First World War. The event was commemorated by the naming of one of the town's main streets as Rue Dudley Gordon after the battalion's Lieutenant-Colonel, the Lord Dudley Gordon, who was presented with the key to the town of Chièvres. In return, a present was made to the town of the flag under which the 5th Battalion had fought since 1915.

References

External links
 

Cities in Wallonia
Municipalities of Hainaut (province)